Visitors to São Tomé and Príncipe must obtain a visa online or from one of the diplomatic missions of São Tomé and Príncipe prior to arrival unless they come from one of the visa exempt countries.

Visa policy map

Visa policy 
Citizens of the following 55 countries can visit São Tomé and Príncipe without a visa for up to 15 days:

Holders of diplomatic or service passports and passports for public affairs of China do not require a visa for 30 days.

 and  signed an agreement of abolishing visas for diplomatic and service passports on 6 July 2022.

Visa on arrival

eVisa
Nationals of countries that require a visa may obtain online through an  system. An eVisa is processed within 7 working days.

Substitute visa

Holders of a visa or resident permit issued by the United States or a Schengen area member state do not require a visa for stays up to 15 days.

Transit
Passengers with a confirmed onward ticket for a flight to a third country on the same calendar day. The passengers must stay in the international transit area of the airport and have documents required for the next destination.

See also

 Visa requirements for Santomean citizens

References

Sao Tome and Principe
Foreign relations of São Tomé and Príncipe